The Kanaura are a tribal community found in Kinnaur district of Himachal Pradesh. They are also known as Kinnara.

Social status
, the Kanaura were classified as a Scheduled Tribe under the Indian government's reservation program of positive discrimination.

References

Scheduled Tribes of Himachal Pradesh